The Wolf Man is a 1924 American silent drama film that starred John Gilbert and Norma Shearer, before they signed with the newly formed MGM. Directed by Edmund Mortimer, the film's story was written by Reed Heustis, and written by Fanny and Frederic Hatton. The Wolf Man is now considered lost.

Plot 
Gerald Stanley (John Gilbert) is an English gentleman who is engaged to Beatrice Joyce (Alma Frances). Stanley's personality changes whenever he drinks, and his brother (who also loves Beatrice) uses this to his advantage. After Stanley's latest blackout, his brother informs him that Stanley killed Beatrice's brother. The horrified Stanley flees from England and goes to live in Quebec. Once sober, Stanley stays away from liquor until he receives word that Beatrice has married his brother. The news sends him on a drinking spree and once again he turns beastly.

In a saloon he gets in a fight and kidnaps Elizabeth Gordon (Norma Shearer), a respectable young girl who has wandered off from her father during a trip through the woods. Stanley takes Elizabeth to his shack, where he tries to force himself on her. His pursuers are closing in so he leaps in a canoe for a wild ride down the rapids. This sobers him up and, mortified by his actions, he apologizes profusely to Elizabeth. When she sees the real Stanley, she falls in love with him, and later on he receives word that Beatrice's brother was never killed.

Cast 
 John Gilbert as Gerald Stanley
 Norma Shearer as Elizabeth Gordon
 Alma Francis as Beatrice Joyce
 George Barraud as Lord Rothstein
 Eugene Pallette as Pierre
 Edgar Norton as Sir Reginald Stackpoole
 Thomas R. Mills as Caulkins
 Max Montisole as Phil Joyce
 Charles Wellesley as Sam Gordon
 Richard Blaydon as Lt. Esmond
 D.R.O. Hatswell as Lord St. Cleve
Mary Warren as English barmaid
 Ebba Mona as Ballet girl

See also
 1937 Fox vault fire

References

External links 
 
 
 

1924 films
1924 drama films
Fox Film films
Silent American drama films
American silent feature films
American black-and-white films
Lost American films
Films directed by Edmund Mortimer
Films set in England
1924 lost films
Lost drama films
1920s American films